Sequeiros is a former freguesia ("civil parish") in Aguiar da Beira Municipality, Guarda District, Portugal. It was merged with Gradiz in 2013 to form the new freguesia Sequeiros e Gradiz.

Demography

References 

Former parishes of Aguiar da Beira